Kranaosphinctes is an extinct genus of ammonites belonging to the Perisphinctidae family. Some authors consider Kranaosphinctes a subgenus of the genus Perisphinctes.

Fossil record
Fossils of Kranaosphinctes are found in marine strata of the Upper Jurassic (age range: from 161.2 to 155.7 million years ago.).  Fossils are known from some localities of Europe, Argentina, India and Madagascar.

References

Jurassic ammonites
Ammonitida genera
Perisphinctidae